Uppsala Basket is a Swedish basketball club based in Uppsala. The team plays in the Superettan, the second tier level in Sweden. The club was founded in 1960 and plays it home games at Fyrishov.

The club is known for its talent development. In recent years, this has been shown by the many players in the Swedish youth national teams hailing from Uppsala. The club has a unique cooperation with a basketball academy.

Honours
Basketligan
Runner-up (1): 2014–15

Results

Current roster

Depth chart

Notable players
 Dee Ayuba (1 season: 2013–14)
 Thomas Jackson (6 seasons: 2003–04, 2006–09, 2012–15)
 Alexander Lindqvist
 Anthony Mathis

External links 
 
www.eurobasket.com

Basketball teams in Sweden
1960 establishments in Sweden
Sport in Uppsala
Basketball teams established in 1960